Joonas Aleksanteri Nättinen (born January 3, 1991) is a Finnish professional ice hockey player for HV71 of the Swedish Hockey League (SHL).

Playing career
In 2008, Nättinen as a JYP-trained player began playing in the SM-liiga for the Espoo Blues. In the 2009 NHL Entry Draft, he was chosen in the third round, 65th overall, by the Montreal Canadiens.

On 26 May 2011, Joonas signed a three-year, entry-level contract with the Canadiens worth $1.825 million at the NHL level. While in the final year of his contract during the 2013–14 season, Nättinen was recalled from affiliate, the Hamilton Bulldogs of the American Hockey League, and joined the Canadiens on 17 January 2014. He made his NHL debut the following day in a brief appearance for the Canadiens in a defeat against the Toronto Maple Leafs. After his singular game with the Canadiens, Nättinen was returned to the Bulldogs for the remainder of the season.

On 5 June 2014, as a restricted free agent, Nättinen opted to return to Europe, signing a one-year contract with Modo Hockey of the Swedish Hockey League.

Nättinen returned to the Finnish Liiga to play in three seasons with JYP before opting to return abroad, securing a one-year contract with Russian club, HC Neftekhimik Nizhnekamsk of the KHL on 2 May 2018.
In the 2018–19 season, Nättinen adapted quickly to the KHL to post 16 goals and 28 points in 54 regular season games.

As a free agent at the conclusion of his contract, Nättinen opted to continue in the KHL, signing a one-year contract with HC Vityaz on 2 May 2019.

Approaching his third season in the KHL, Nättinen joined his third club, agreeing to a contract with Severstal Cherepovets on 8 August 2020.

After two seasons with Severstal, Nättinen left the KHL as a free agent and returned for a second stint in the SHL, signing a two-year contract with HV71 on 3 June 2022.

Career statistics

Regular season and playoffs

International

References

External links

1991 births
Living people
Espoo Blues players
Finnish ice hockey centres
Hamilton Bulldogs (AHL) players
HPK players
HV71 players
JYP Jyväskylä players
Modo Hockey players
Montreal Canadiens draft picks
Montreal Canadiens players
HC Neftekhimik Nizhnekamsk players
People from Jämsä
Severstal Cherepovets players
HC Vityaz players
Ice hockey players at the 2022 Winter Olympics
Olympic ice hockey players of Finland
Medalists at the 2022 Winter Olympics
Olympic gold medalists for Finland
Olympic medalists in ice hockey
Sportspeople from Central Finland